Abraham Rinkle Dowden (February 14, 1839 – September 18, 19071) was a minor Democratic political figure in Natchitoches Parish, Louisiana, in the late-19th and early-20th centuries. He was Postmaster of the Fourth Class Post Office in Kisatchie, Louisiana, from 1887 to 1891.3  He was known by "A.R." for most of his life.

Biography
He was the son of Hugh Dowden8, who was born in Fayette, Jefferson County, Mississippi Territory2 to a family of early pioneers, probably from Pennsylvania.  Abraham Dowden married1 Louisa Ann Dendy (1840-19349) in Kisatchie, Louisiana1 on December 23, 18561.  He was 17 years old, she was 16.  Conducting the ceremony was Rev. Edmund Duggan1 of Many, LA.1

The first child of A.R. and Louisa, known only as "Son" Dowden, was born in and died in 1858.  Usually, in that area, children buried unnamed had been stillborn or died at childbirth.  The second son, Francis Marion (later "Bridge") Dowden was born September 6, 1860.  The third son. Thomas Jefferson Dowden, was born February 14, 1862.  These and subsequent children were all born in Kisatchie. LA.

He enlisted in Co. E1, Sabine Guards4, 11th Louisiana Infantry1, on May 144, 18621 in Many, Louisiana4 during the American Civil War.  He was a couple of weeks shy of his 24th birthday.

An interesting fact is that A.R.'s May 14 enlistment date was a mere two weeks after the birth of his second son, Thomas Jefferson Dowden.  One may wonder why he left his 22-year-old wife with an 18-month-old toddler and a two-week-old baby to enlist.  Very probably, it was not because of loyalty to slavery, because neither he nor any of his family own any slaves.  They were not that wealthy.  Likely, as with most southern families at the time, service in the Confederate Army was more about protecting his homeland and family than slavery.

Also possible, but less likely, is that A.R. was following the lead of his two older brothers, James Andrew Dowden (1837-1862) and Shelton Powell Dowden (1838-1862).

James Andrew Dowden, the eldest brother, served in Co. H, later M, 12th Louisiana Infantry under Capt. B.D. Owens.  He enlisted August 18, 1861, at Camp Moore, LA.  (Other undocumented sources say he enlisted 26 Jul 1861.)  The unit was sent by rail to Union City, Tennessee and from there marched to Columbus, KY on Sept. 3, 1861.  They remained there six months in the construction of earthworks and obstructions along the Mississippi River.  They were transferred to Island No (source illegible) in March, 1862, after the fall of Ft. Danetson made their position untenable.  After two weeks, the regiment sent on garrison duty at Ft. Pillow, Tennessee, for three months.  James Andrew died at Ft. Pillow, TN May 6, 1862, exactly two years after his marriage to Narcissa Amarylla Davis (1841-1862).  Likely, he died from typhoid fever, as the 12th was hit severely by typhoid during its sojourn at Ft. Pillow.

Shelton Powell Dowden, the second-oldest of Hugh Dowden's five sons, was a bachelor all his life.  He was listed6 as a 20-year-old farm laborer6 in the household of Elijah and Louisa A Self6 prior to his enlistment in Company C, 12th Louisiana Infantry.  Shelton never returned from the war.  He was presumed killed in action.  The Muster Roll of his unit states that he was "absent at hospital since Sept. 25, 1862" in Bolivar, TN.7

A.R.'s 11th Louisiana Regiment was combined with the 16th Louisiana Infantry and the Crescent Regiment to form the Consolidated Crescent Regiment on November 3, 1863, in Simmesport, Louisiana.  Dowden rose to the rank of sergeant during the war.  The Consolidated Crescent Regiment was heavily involved in contesting Union General Nathaniel Banks' Red River Campaign.  At the Battle of Mansfield, Louisiana, on April 8, 1864, the unit took more than 175 casualties and was the only Louisiana unit to lose all three field officers in a single battle.  Among the casualties were Dowden's brother-in-law, Corporal Thomas J. Dendy, who was killed, and his brother, Sergeant Stephen Grant Dowden, who was wounded.  The Consolidated Crescent Regiment surrendered with the Confederate Army of the Trans-Mississippi on May 26, 1865.  Dowden was paroled on June 8, 1865, and returned home to Natchitoches Parish.

He became active in local politics later in life, and was serving on the Natchitoches Parish Police Jury at the time of his death.  His death was reportedly due to "rheumatism and kidney Trouble."1

References
 "Widow's Application for Persion" for Louisa A. Dendy Dowden, aged 70, to State of Louisiana, dated October 9, 1911.
 Family Group Record compiled by Carolyn Dowden Grimm Jamail, 25 Jan 1997.
 Quarterly Postal ACcount—Fourth Class Office, Post Office Department.  Post Office, Kisatchie, LA.  July 1, 1887, to June 10, 1891.
 Bergeron, A.W., Jr.  1989.  Guide to Louisiana Confederate Military Units 1861–1865.  Louisiana State University Press.  Baton Rouge, Louisiana.  pp.146–147, 164-165.
 U.S. War Department, 1911. Document 10.317, 1841586.  The Adjutant General's Office.  Washington, DC.
 1860 Sabine Parish, LA Census.
 LISTED IN PUBLICATION OF CONFEDERATE SOLDIERS ROSTER, LA  CO C, 12TH LA INF.
 1860 Natchitoches Parish, Louisiana, Census. Page 526.
 Affidavit to State of Louisiana, Board of Pension Commissioners. "Death of Pensioner" dated March 30, 1934.

1839 births
1907 deaths
Louisiana Democrats
People from Natchitoches Parish, Louisiana